The 1986 Goldstar Cologne, also known as the Cologne Grand Prix, was a men's tennis tournament played on indoor carpet courts in Cologne, West Germany that was part of the 1986 Nabisco Grand Prix circuit. It was the 11th and last edition of the tournament and was held from 31 March through 6 April 1986. Unseeded Jonas Svensson won the singles title.

Finals

Singles
 Jonas Svensson defeated  Stefan Eriksson 6–7, 6–2, 6–2
 It was Svensson's first singles title of his career.

Doubles
 Kelly Evernden /  Chip Hooper defeated  Jan Gunnarsson /  Peter Lundgren 6–4, 6–7, 6–3

References

External links
 ITF tournament edition details

Cologne Cup
Cologne Cup